Elstob is a surname. Notable people with the surname include:

Elizabeth Elstob (1683–1756), scholar
Peter Elstob (1915–2002), British soldier, author, and entrepreneur
Wilfrith Elstob (1888–1918), English recipient of the Victoria Cross
William Elstob (1673–1715), English divine